The 2015 Liberian First Division League (known as the LFA-Cellcom First Division League for sponsorship reasons) was the 42nd season of the Liberian Premier League, the Liberian professional league for association football clubs, since the league's establishment in 1956. The season began on 6 June 2015 and ended on 27 September 2015.

Teams 
A total of 12 teams contested the league, including 9 sides from the 2013 season and three promoted from the 2013-2014 Second Division League. The teams are split up into two groups of six teams each.

Nimba United beat LISCR FC in the final. They earned the right to compete in the 2016 CAF Champions League.

References

External links
Liberian First Division - Soccerway
Liberia First Division 2015 - RSSSF

Football competitions in Liberia
Liberia
Liberia
First Division